Austrocnemis maccullochi is a species of damselfly in the family Coenagrionidae,
commonly known as a tiny longlegs. 
It is a tiny damselfly, bronze-black in colour with very long legs.
It occurs across coastal northern Australia and New Guinea,
where it inhabits still waters.

Gallery

See also
 List of Odonata species of Australia

References 

Coenagrionidae
Odonata of Australia
Insects of Australia
Insects of New Guinea
Taxa named by Robert John Tillyard
Insects described in 1926
Damselflies